Dmitrievsky Chemical Plant was a chemical plant located in Kineshma, the second-largest town in Ivanovo Oblast, Russia. It manufactured butyl acetate, and other products including industrial solvents.

It was engulfed in fire in April 2022. Numerous news sites noted that the fire happened on the same day as the unexplained fire at the Russian Aerospace Defense Forces’ Central Research Institute in Tver.

References

External links 
 

Chemical plants
Former buildings and structures in Russia
Buildings and structures in Ivanovo Oblast
2022 fires in Europe
2022 disestablishments in Russia
Fires in Russia